Jay Leno is an American comedian, actor, writer, producer, and television host.

Film

Television

References

Filmography
American filmographies
Male actor filmographies